Jamalabad Rural District is in Sharifabad District of Pakdasht County, Tehran province, Iran. At the National Census of 2006, its population was 12,718 in 3,361 households. There were 13,426 inhabitants in 3,654 households at the following census of 2011. At the most recent census of 2016, the population of the rural district was 29,684 in 8,737 households. The largest of its seven villages was Mojtame-e Shahid Namju, with 22,990 people.

References 

Pakdasht County

Rural Districts of Tehran Province

Populated places in Tehran Province

Populated places in Pakdasht County